Visalia, California, commonly known in the 1850s as Four Creeks, is the oldest continuously inhabited inland European settlement between Stockton and Los Angeles. The city played an important role in the American colonization of the San Joaquin Valley as the county seat of Old Tulare County, an expansive region comprising most if not all of modern-day Fresno, Kings, and Kern counties.

History

European and Native American Conflicts
The Spanish were reluctant to settle in this area because of climate and the danger they perceived from the local Native American population.  An influx of European trappers, traders, explorers, miners and settlers affected the lifestyle of the native Yokuts since the Europeans brought a non hunter-gatherer culture as well as diseases to which the Yokuts had no resistance. Following the discovery of gold in California in 1848, settlers flooded into the San Joaquin Valley and carried out a campaign to drive the Yokuts off their land. In his December 20, 1849 Inaugural Address, the first governor of California Peter Hardeman Burnett remarked "That a war of extermination will continue to be waged between the two races until the Indian race becomes extinct, must be expected". Between the years of 1851–1854, the total amount
of claims submitted to State of California Comptroller for Expeditions against the Indians (by militias) was $1,293,179.20. As a consequence of 18 unratified (and highly controversial) treaties between California Indians and the United States government, the Yokuts were removed from their lands and a reservation system was eventually established for them. A few surviving groups can be found in area rancherias and reservations.

Early European Settlements
When California achieved statehood in 1850, Tulare County did not exist. The land that is now Tulare County was part of the huge Mariposa County. Then called Four Creeks, the area got its name from the many watershed creeks and rivers flowing from the Sierra Nevada Mountains. All the water resulted in a widespread swampy area with a magnificent oak forest. This forest was an attractive place in the otherwise dry and arid region. These oak trees extended four or five miles north of Visalia, and west nearly to present-day Goshen, California, but a little farther south, along the streams leading toward Tulare Lake, the oak trees extended much farther west, and in the vicinity of Tulare they extended as far west as the present town of Waukena. The first Anglo-American settler to become a permanent resident of the region was probably Loomis St. John, who built a cabin on what would subsequently be called the St. John's River (California). In 1849 two young Texas bear hunters, Nathaniel Vise and Gilbert Dean arrived in the Four Creeks region. While Vise went on a trip to San Francisco, he left Dean at the St. John cabin. On December 1, 1850, a native of Jackson County, Missouri, and a resident of Agua Fria, California named John Woods, left the Mariposa country for the Four Creeks region, arriving with fourteen men. Woods built a cabin on the south bank of the Kaweah River, seven miles east of modern Visalia. The Kawia Yokuts, led by an escaped mission native named Francisco, attacked the group killing all but two. Woods barricaded himself in his cabin but was finally captured and flayed alive, his skin nailed to a large oak tree. This subsequently became known as the Woods Massacre. The Kawia Yokuts asserted that one of these men had captured many of their people and had performed operations on them. The astounded natives resented this mutilation and retaliated by torturing and killing their oppressors. When General Patten arrived with a detachment from Fort Miller, California to investigate in the spring of 1851, he refused to take any action against Francisco. Patten built a fort half a mile from the Woods cabin where the Kaweah enters the valley. The same year, 1851, Nathaniel Vise returned and settled in the vicinity of the town which would be Visalia.
 
Settlers petitioned the state legislature for county status and on July 10, 1852, Tulare County became a reality. Nathaniel was responsible for surveying the new settlement. In November 1852 he wrote, "The town contains from 60-80 inhabitants, 30 of whom are children of school age. The town is located upon one of the subdivisions of the Kaweah (River) and is destined to be the county seat of Tulare.” In 1853, Visalia became the county seat of Tulare County, then an extensive County encompassing parts or all of Madera, Fresno, Kings and Kern Counties. Visalia was named after Visalia, Kentucky, a place to which Nathaniel Vise can trace his family ancestry.

Early Visalian history indicates that a school and a Methodist Church were established the same year and the following year a grist mill and a general store were built. Visalia has been called a one-time "capital" of the buckaroos or vaqueros, the California cowboys.

Luxilis occidentalis
Four Creeks is the only place that the fish Luxilis occidentalis is known to have lived except for Poso Creek in Kern County. It was collected here in 1855 by Dr A.L. Heerman.

California Gold Rush and Population Boom
In 1858 Visalia was added to John Butterfield's Overland Stage route from St. Louis to San Francisco. A plaque commemorating the location can be found at 116 East Main Street. Included in the early crop of citizens were some notorious individuals who preyed on the Butterfield Overland Mail and its passengers. Many saloons and hotels sprouted up around the stage stop downtown and commerce was brisk if a bit risky.

When the telegraph arrived in 1860 it brought word of war.

During the Civil War many Visalians were divided between the North and South. Factions supporting both lived together begrudgingly in the area, and local officials failed to arbitrate the tenuous situation leading to the federal government's banning of Visalia's pro-South Equal Rights Expositor newspaper.

On June 24, 1862, the military garrison Camp Babbitt was established by two companies of the 2nd California Cavalry, one mile from central Visalia. Although largely remembered locally for its role in putting down Confederate sympathizers, another primary military role was as a strategic base in the Owens Valley Indian War of 1862–1863, notably for its association with the Keyesville Massacre. It was abandoned in 1866.

Visalia was first incorporated during the Civil War years. The second incorporation and city charter was granted in 1874; it was in this charter that a common council and an ex-officio Mayor and President were established, a system which—alongside at-large elections—is still in use today.

Population growth

Oak tradition

Enjoying and caring for oak trees has been a Visalia tradition for nearly 100 years. City neighborhoods lined with these graceful trees show the foresight of early community leaders. When Visalia was founded in 1852, it was located in the largest valley oak woodland in California. Nourished in the fertile soils of the Kaweah River delta, valley oaks covered a  area. As Visalia's population grew, more trees were cut down for firewood and to make room for new crops. Fewer trees remained. In the 1890s, Visalians saw the oak tree as a renewable source of community pride and identity that deserved preservation. Community leaders worked together to protect the valley oak. Mooney Grove Park is still one of the largest valley oak woodlands in California. In 1922, local groups started the first tree planting program, putting into the ground the oak sentinels now lining Highway 198. In 1971, the city passed an ordinance requiring a permit to remove an oak tree. In 1974, maintenance and preservation guidelines were added. Removing a Valley oak tree without a permit can be a $1,000 fine.

The End of the Trail

Visalia was home to the original The End of the Trail statue by James Earle Fraser and its companion piece, The Pioneer by Solon Borglum, from 1920 to 1968. The city acquired them when they found that the  famous statues were being discarded by San Francisco city officials after having no means to display them once the 1915 Panama–Pacific International Exposition was over. Today the original statue of The End of the Trail is at the National Cowboy & Western Museum in Oklahoma City. Before it was moved for the long term, a true-to-scale bronze replica was made and placed near the same spot in Mooney Grove Park where the original had stood for 48 years. The Pioneer statue was in too poor a condition to similarly preserve; it was destroyed in a 1980 earthquake, and remains in pieces in the Visalia area.

References

When the two statues, The Pioneer and The End Of The Trail was placed at Mooney Grove Park, the Pioneer was placed at the entrance of the park and was thought to depict life in the Visalia Area.
Both statues were made using wood frames covered with stucco netting and stucco.  The Pioneer fell apart because of dry rot. As children we played on both statues in the early 1940s.

Visalia
Visalia, California
History of Tulare County, California